Pretty Rhythm: Rainbow Live is a 2013 anime television series produced by Tatsunoko Production and Avex Pictures. It is the third animated series based on the Pretty Rhythm arcade game franchise by Takara Tomy. The series aired in Japan on TV Tokyo from April 6, 2013 to March 29, 2014, replacing Pretty Rhythm: Dear My Future in its initial timeslot. The English dub was aired on Animax Asia for Southeast Asian distribution in 2014. Each episode ended with a live-action segment titled "Pretty Rhythm Club", which was hosted by Prizmmy, a girl group put together by Avex Pictures, and their sister trainee group, Prism Mates.

After the series' run, it was succeeded by Pretty Rhythm: All Star Selection in 2014. A sequel spin-off focusing on Koji, Hiro, and Kazuki, titled the King of Prism series, launched in theaters beginning with the film King of Prism by Pretty Rhythm after positive feedback from releasing the full version of their theme song, "Athletic Core", and cheer screenings.

As a collaboration with Avex Pictures to celebrate TRF's 20th anniversary, Prizmmy covered several of their songs as opening themes. The opening theme songs are "Boy Meets Girl for episodes 1-13; "EZ Do Dance" for episodes 14-26; "Crazy Gonna Crazy" for episodes 27-39; and "Butterfly Effect" for episodes 40-51; all songs were performed by Prizmmy. The ending theme songs are "RainBow × RainBow" by Prism Box for episodes 1-13; "Rainbow" by Iris for episodes 14-27; "I wannabee myself (Jibun Rashiku Itai)" by Emiri Katō, Yū Serizawa, and Mikako Komatsu for episodes 27-39; and "Happy Star Restaurant" by Prism Box for episodes 40-51.

Episode 39 scored an average household viewership of 1.9%.

Episode list

References

Pretty Rhythm
Pretty Rhythm: Rainbow Live